Burnt Offerings is the third studio album by American heavy metal band Iced Earth. Released on April 18, 1995, it was the group's first album since 1991's Night of the Stormrider, after which the band took a three-year layoff. During this time they recruited drummer Rodney Beasley and singer Matthew Barlow, replacing Rick Secchiari and John Greely, respectively.

Burnt Offerings has been described as Iced Earth's heaviest and darkest record. Rhythm guitarist and main songwriter Jon Schaffer has said that the heaviness of the songs were a result of his frustration with the music industry. Schaffer's frustration is particularly evident in the title track, which talks about the problems the band had to endure during its downtime.

The album is also notable for including one of the longest songs Iced Earth has ever recorded; "Dante's Inferno". Clocking in at 16 minutes and 26 seconds, "Dante's Inferno" is based on the Inferno segment of Dante Alighieri's epic poem, the Divine Comedy. The album starts with a spoken line from Bram Stoker's Dracula. The album's original cover art was also a painting by Gustave Doré, of Lucifer from the Divine Comedy.

Track listing
All lyrics and music written by Jon Schaffer, except where noted.

On the original CD, released in 1995, "Dante's Inferno" was divided into three parts on a single track. On subsequent re-releases since then, the song has been listed as one track.

2008 Slave to the Dark bonus disc

Personnel

 Iced Earth
Matthew Barlow − lead vocals
Jon Schaffer − rhythm guitar, lead guitar, vocals, co-producer
Dave Abell − bass
Randall Shawver − lead guitar
Rodney Beasley − drums

 Additional musicians
Howard Helm − keyboards

 Other personnel
Tom Morris – co-producer, engineer
Tim Hubbard – photography
Axel Hermann – artwork (on 2001 reissue)
Travis Smith – artwork (on 2001 reissue)
Jim Morris – mixing, mastering (on 2001 reissue)

References

External links
 Iced Earth's official website

1995 albums
Iced Earth albums
Century Media Records albums
Albums recorded at Morrisound Recording